is a Japanese former football player.

Playing career
Hayashi was born in Komatsushima on October 5, 1983. After graduating from high school, he joined the J2 League club Avispa Fukuoka in 2002. He played in the first season and played many matches as forward in 2003. Although he did not play as much in 2004, Avispa was promoted to the J1 League at the end of the 2005 season. In October 2006, he was loaned to the Regional Leagues club V-Varen Nagasaki. In 2007, he returned to Avispa, which was relegated to J2 for the 2007 season and he played in many matches. In 2008, he moved to Tokushima Vortis. Although he played during two seasons, he did not play in many matches. In 2010, he moved to Tochigi SC. He played often, and scored one goal. In 2011, he moved to Giravanz Kitakyushu. He played often and scored many goals in 2011. However, he did not play as much in 2012 and he retired at the end of the 2012 season.

Club statistics

References

External links

1983 births
Living people
Association football people from Tokushima Prefecture
Japanese footballers
J1 League players
J2 League players
Avispa Fukuoka players
V-Varen Nagasaki players
Tokushima Vortis players
Tochigi SC players
Giravanz Kitakyushu players
Association football forwards